Savo Pavićević (Cyrillic: Саво Павићевић, ; born 11 December 1980) is a Serbian-born Montenegrin retired football defender.

Club career
Pavićević, after playing for almost a decade for Hajduk Kula, played for Vojvodina and for the German Bundesliga club FC Energie Cottbus. On 19 August 2009 he signed for AO Kavala. On 16 August 2010, Pavićević agreed with Maccabi Tel Aviv signing on a one-year deal following the injury of Nivaldo. In June 2011, Pavićević signed a one-year extension on his original contract with Maccabi. On 3 June 2012, he came to an agreement with AC Omonia and later he played a half season in 2012-2013 for the Israeli club Hapoel Tel Aviv. In the second half of January 2014, Savo signed for Serbian club Red Star Belgrade.

International career
He was the founding member of the National team of Montenegro and made his debut in his country's first ever competitive match on 24 March 2007, a friendly against Hungary in Podgorica. He has earned a total of 39 caps, scoring no goals. His final international was an October 2014 European Championship qualification match against Liechtenstein.

Honours
AC Omonia
Cypriot Super Cup (1): 2012
Red Star Belgrade
 Serbian SuperLiga (2): 2013–14, 2015–16

References

External links
 
 Savo Pavićević at Dekisa.Tripod

1980 births
Living people
Sportspeople from Kikinda
Montenegrin people of Serbian descent
Serbian people of Montenegrin descent
Association football defenders
Serbia and Montenegro footballers
Montenegrin footballers
Montenegro international footballers
FK Hajduk Kula players
FK TSC Bačka Topola players
FK Vojvodina players
FC Energie Cottbus players
Kavala F.C. players
Maccabi Tel Aviv F.C. players
AC Omonia players
Hapoel Tel Aviv F.C. players
Anorthosis Famagusta F.C. players
Red Star Belgrade footballers
FK Spartak Subotica players
First League of Serbia and Montenegro players
Serbian SuperLiga players
Bundesliga players
Super League Greece players
Israeli Premier League players
Cypriot First Division players
Montenegrin expatriate footballers
Expatriate footballers in Germany
Montenegrin expatriate sportspeople in Germany
Expatriate footballers in Greece
Montenegrin expatriate sportspeople in Greece
Expatriate footballers in Israel
Montenegrin expatriate sportspeople in Israel
Expatriate footballers in Cyprus
Montenegrin expatriate sportspeople in Cyprus